Takeshi Suzuki may refer to:

, Japanese professor of Urdu
, Japanese Paralympic alpine skier
 Takeshi Suzuki (baseball), Japanese baseball player, played in 1954 Nippon Professional Baseball season

See also
 Takashi Suzuki (disambiguation)